Valley of the Dragons may refer to:

 Nemegt Basin, a geographical area in the northwestern Gobi Desert, known locally as the "Valley of the Dragons"
 Valley of the Dragons (film), a 1961 American science fiction film